Haseeb Amjad (born 11 November 1987) is a Hong Kong cricketer. He played for Hong Kong in the 2014 ICC World Twenty20 tournament. He made his One Day International debut against Afghanistan in the 2014 ACC Premier League on 1 May 2014.

In October 2018, he was charged with five offences under the ICC Anti-Corruption Code. In August 2019, the ICC banned him for five years from all forms of cricket. The majority of the offences related to matches played by Hong Kong against Canada and Scotland during the 2014 Cricket World Cup Qualifier tournament in New Zealand.

See also
 List of cricketers banned for corruption

References

External links
 

1987 births
Living people
Hong Kong cricketers
Hong Kong One Day International cricketers
Hong Kong Twenty20 International cricketers
Cricketers from Rawalpindi
Pakistani emigrants to Hong Kong
Hong Kong people of Punjabi descent
Sportspeople of Pakistani descent